Singburi United Football Club (Thai สิงห์บุรี ยูไนเต็ด), is a Thai football club based in Singburi province, Thailand. The club is currently playing in the Thai Football Division 3.

Record

References
 104 ทีมร่วมชิงชัย! แบโผผลจับสลาก ดิวิชั่น 3 ฤดูกาล 2016

External links
 Facebookpage

Association football clubs established in 2016
Football clubs in Thailand
2016 establishments in Thailand